Vatutinki is a rural locality (a village) in Novomoskovsky Administrative Okrug of the federal city of Moscow, Russia, located on the Desna River. Its population as of the 2010 Census was 11,081; up from 9,581 recorded in the 2002 Census.

Vatutinki was a part of Leninsky District of Moscow Oblast until July 1, 2012, when a part of that district was merged into Moscow.

The village is the location of a GRU base with Space Intelligence Directorate. It manages the Russian space reconnaissance program in coordination with the Fleet Intelligence Direction of the Fifth Directorate.

References

External links
Information about GRU command in Vatutinki

Novomoskovsky Administrative Okrug
Rural localities in Moscow (federal city)